Armando Silvestre Carrascosa (born January 28, 1926) is a Mexican-American actor.

Life and career
Silvestre was born on January 28, 1926 in San Diego, California, but he is originally from Tijuana, Mexico. He dropped out of college in order to pursue a career in bullfighting, but turned to acting after being badly gored by a bull.

In 1960, Silvestre starred in Las rosas del milagro, a historical drama set during the time of the Spanish conquest of the Aztec Empire.

Silvestre was firstly married to Leonor Plaza, a Venezuelan woman, but later divorced. He later married artistic representative Blanca Estela Limon, and as of 2011, was living in California.

Selected filmography

Films 

 Lola Casanova (1948)
 Here Comes Martin Corona (1952)
 Hiawatha (1952)
 Rossana (1953)
 Take Me in Your Arms (1954)
 Invincible Guns (1960)
 The Miracle Roses (1960)
 Santo Contra los Zombis (1961)
 Geronimo (1962)
 Kings of the Sun (1963)
 The Scalphunters (1968)
 Two Mules for Sister Sara (1970)
 Midnight Dolls (1979)

Television

References

External links

 

1926 births
Living people
Mexican male film actors
Mexican male telenovela actors
Mexican male television actors